The 2022 season was Kashima Antlers' 30th consecutive season in the J1 League, the top flight of Japanese football since the introduction of professional football in 1993. The club finished the 2022 J1 League in fourth place, exactly the same position as the previous season. They also competed in the Emperor's Cup where they reached the semi-finals and the J.League Cup where they were knocked out at the play-off stage.

Kashima started the league season strongly winning six of their first seven games and were in first position for a number of weeks before the end of May. Forward Ayase Ueda was in fine form and won the first J.League Monthly MVP award of the season. From May onwards, the performances started to detioriate and wins became hard to come by. Following the departure of top-scorer Ueda to Cercle Brugge at the start of July, scoring goals also became difficult and by August following two consecutive defeats, Kashima decided to part ways with manager René Weiler after only a few months in the post. Daiki Iwamasa took over as manager and in spite of only winning two of his ten league games in charge, led Kashima to a fourth-place finish.

Kashima had a good run in the Emperor's Cup, but would have hoped to have been finalists following defeat at the semi-final stage by J2 League club and eventual winners Ventforet Kofu. Yuma Suzuki was their top scorer in the competition with two goals.

Squad
All players ages displayed below shows their age at the first match of the J1 League season, on 19 February 2022.

Season squad

Transfers

Arrivals

Departures

Pre-season and friendlies
Kashima played one pre-season friendly as part of the Ibaraki Soccer Festival against their Ibaraki neighbours Mito Hollyhock.

Competitions

Overview

J1 League

Results by matchday

Results

J.League Cup 

Kashima were drawn into Group A as the team that finished in the highest position in the league in the previous season (4th) without qualifying for the 2022 AFC Champions League – the four that did qualify received byes from the group stage of the cup.

Group stage

Play-off stage

2–2 on aggregate. Avispa Fukuoka won on away goals.

Emperor's Cup

Statistics

Appearances

Goalscorers 
The list is sorted by shirt number when total goals are equal.

Assists 
The list is sorted by shirt number when total goals are equal.

Clean sheets
The list is sorted by shirt number when total clean sheets are equal.

References 

Kashima Antlers
Kashima Antlers seasons